Vardeneset Ballklubb is a Norwegian association football club from Stavanger.

The club was founded on 22 November 1990 when it split from the multi-sports club Vardeneset IF, founded in 1975. The club colours are white and red.

The men's football team currently plays in the Third Division, the fourth tier of Norwegian football. The team has had a long stint in the Third Division, running since 2001.

References
Citations

Bibliography
 Official site 

Football clubs in Norway
Sport in Stavanger
Association football clubs established in 1990
1990 establishments in Norway